is a Japanese professional baseball catcher for the Yokohama DeNA BayStars of the Nippon Professional Baseball (NPB). He previously played for the Orix Buffaloes.

On November 13, 2019, Takajo signed with the Yokohama DeNA BayStars. November 19, 2019, he held press conference.

References

External links

 NPB.com

1993 births
Baseball people from Fukuoka (city)
Living people
Japanese baseball players
Nippon Professional Baseball catchers
Orix Buffaloes players
Yokohama DeNA BayStars players